Masochism is the upcoming second studio album by American singer-songwriter Sky Ferreira. Following the release of her long-delayed debut album, Night Time, My Time (2013), Ferreira announced its follow-up, titled Masochism, shortly thereafter. The album's release has been frequently delayed, with intended releases in 2015, 2016 and 2018, with the most recent comments from Ferreira and her mother stating it would be released in 2022. To promote the record, Ferreira released the first single "Downhill Lullaby" in March 2019, and the second single "Don't Forget" in 2022.

Background
In an interview with Paper magazine in 2018, Ferreira said the album was seeing frequent delays due to her being a "perfectionist". Among other issues, Ferreira has expressed frustration with her label over creative control of her music and the artistic direction they want to steer her in. Ferreira famously took to the internet to ask help in regaining control of her SoundCloud account which her label assumed responsibility for and changed her password to. While on a release hiatus, Ferreira has performed at music festivals, walked runways as a model, and acted in the film Baby Driver and the show Twin Peaks.

In March 2019, Ferreira released the first single from Masochism, "Downhill Lullaby". The single was followed by the release of a cover of "Voices Carry" on SoundCloud in July. Ferreira formally announced her album release again during summer 2019. In an interview with Pitchfork, Ferriera mentioned that "Downhill Lullaby" and a new song titled "Don't Forget" would both be on the record. In July 2019, Ferreira premiered a song titled "Descending" during her set at Pitchfork Music Festival in Chicago. In August, she was featured on "Cross You Out", the first promotional single off Charli XCX's third studio album Charli. In October, Ferreira expressed plans to release music before the end of the decade (2010s), though no new music was released. On March 31, 2022, Ferreira posted an Instagram video of her comeback single teaser "Don't Forget" with no specific date mentioned.

In an interview with Dazed which was published in February 2016, Ferreira talked about the album and why she chose to call it Masochism, stating: "I started writing the lyrics two years ago when I was touring, and that's when the name came to me. The way I look at it, it's about going from one thing to another. I've learned a lot about myself and my own self-value. Before, in order to feel good about anything there had to be some kind of struggle, a painful way to get to it, otherwise I felt I didn’t really deserve it. I became a bit of a masochist in every single way – for a while it was like, 'If it doesn't hurt then it’s not real.' I'm still in the thick of everything changing, but change, like, sucks! It's good in the long run, but it's fucking weird and uncomfortable. When I feel like I've reached the point where I'm somewhat comfortable with it, that's when the album ends".

At the 2022 Met Gala after-party, Ferreira confirmed in an interview with Elle, that the album is coming soon. On May 18, 2022, Ferreira announced the date of her comeback and second single from the record, titled "Don't Forget", which was released on May 25.

Composition
Ferreira has stated in interviews that the record will be produced by Ariel Rechtshaid, Justin Raisen, Mike Dean, and Bobby Gillespie of Primal Scream.

References

Albums produced by Ariel Rechtshaid
Albums produced by Justin Raisen
Albums produced by Mike Dean (record producer)
Sky Ferreira albums
Upcoming albums